Sestroretsk railway station (stantsiya Sestroretsk) was a railway station in Sestroretsk, Russia handling transportation to northern destinations including Beloostrov and Sestroretsk.

The station was built by Finnish State Railways as the railhead feeder of Riihimäki–Saint Petersburg railway. It was designed by Swedish architects and it opened on 2 November 1871, when the station's first train arrived from Beloostrov. The Sestroretsk spur line was constructed to serve Sestroretsk armory.

History
The station was owned and operated by Finnish railways from 1871 to 1873. From 1873 to 1886 it was operated by the private "Societies of the Sestroretsk railway". This company built a new railway line, which was called Miller's line, and connected to the station at Miller's pier. The organization was devastated in the mid-1880s and, on 1 January 1886, the station was closed along with the branch.

In 1914, World War I began. Sestroretsk armory was a leading defensive factory and it was necessary to connect it with the country's railway system. In 1916, the station was restored as a freight terminal.

The line did not exist for long. After the revolution Sestroretsk armory had practically stopped production and, in the 1920s, there was a complication of relations between the USSR and Finland. The bridge was blown up and the line was disassembled.

Later, the part of the line from the bridge straight across the Sestra river was restored and was a part of the Sestroretsk direction. In 1924, a new line was constructed but bypassed this station.  The platforms, buildings, and structures were taken down to allow the building of new houses on Volodarsky street. The old station was replaced by a new 
Sestroretsk railway station.

References

Railway stations opened in 1871
Railway stations closed in 1886
Railway stations opened in 1916
1871 establishments in the Russian Empire
Kurortny District